William Edmond Robinson (June 1, 1920 – October 16, 1992) was an American politician and banking executive from the state of Missouri. A Democrat, he served one term as Missouri State Treasurer from 1969 to 1973.

Early life
Robinson was born in St. Francois County, Missouri on June 1, 1920. He grew up around Bonne Terre, Missouri and received his public education there. Following high school, Robinson attended Central Methodist College in Fayette, Missouri. He married Janet Naomi Parham of St. Louis in 1942. Later he married Angie LeClair.

Working life and politics
Prior to being elected Missouri State Treasurer in November 1968 Robinson in the banking and insurance fields. He served as managing officer and secretary-treasurer of Bonne Terre Savings and Loan Association, as well as chairman of the board of the Missouri Savings and Loan League. Other private workforce experience includes being President and board member of Frontier-Tower Life Insurance of Jefferson City, Missouri. William Robinson served one term as state treasurer from January 1969 to January 1973. He died on October 16, 1992.

References

1920 births
1992 deaths
State treasurers of Missouri
Missouri Democrats
Central Methodist University alumni
20th-century American politicians
People from Bonne Terre, Missouri